In Abrahamic religions (Judaism, Christianity and Islam), Gabriel is an archangel with power to announce God's will to men. He is mentioned in the Hebrew Bible, the New Testament, and the Quran. Many Christian traditions — including Catholicism, Eastern Orthodoxy, and Anglicanism — revere Gabriel as a saint.

In the Hebrew Bible, Gabriel appears to the prophet Daniel to explain his visions (Daniel 8:15–26, 9:21–27). The archangel also appears in the Book of Enoch and other ancient Jewish writings not preserved in Hebrew. Alongside the archangel Michael, Gabriel is described as the guardian angel of Israel, defending its people against the angels of the other nations. 

In the New Testament, the Gospel of Luke relates the stories of the Annunciation, in which the angel Gabriel appears to Zechariah and the Virgin Mary, announcing to each the births of John the Baptist / Yahya and Jesus / Isa, respectively (Luke 1:11–38). 

Islam regards Gabriel as an archangel sent by God to various prophets, including Muhammad. The first five verses of the Al-Alaq, the 96th chapter of the Quran, is believed by Muslims to have been the first verses revealed by Gabriel to Muhammad.

Etymology
"Gabriel" is a Hebrew name generally translated "strength of God", more accurately "my strength is in God", or "God is my strength". This connotes a "man of God".

Judaism

Hebrew Bible
In the Hebrew Bible, Gabriel appears to the prophet Daniel to explain his visions (Daniel 8:15–26, 9:21–27). Later the angel Michael also appears to him (Daniel 10:13, 21, Daniel 12,1). These are the first instances of a named angel in the Bible. Gabriel's main function in Daniel is that of revealer,  responsible for interpreting Daniel's visions, a role he continues to have in later traditions.

Rabbinic Judaism
Gabriel, is interpreted by Talmudic rabbis to be the "man in linen" mentioned in the Book of Daniel and the Book of Ezekiel. Talmudic Judaism understands the angel in the Book of Ezekiel, who was sent to destroy Jerusalem, to be Gabriel. According to the Jewish Encyclopedia, Gabriel takes the form of a man, and stands at the left hand of God. Shimon ben Lakish (Syria Palaestina, 3rd century) concluded that the angelic names of Michael, Raphael, and Gabriel came out of the Babylonian exile (Gen. Rab. 48:9). Alongside archangel Michael, Gabriel is described as the guardian angel of Israel, defending this people against the angels of the other nations.

Mystical Judaism
In the Kabbalistic tradition, Gabriel is identified with the sephirah of Yesod. Gabriel also has a prominent role as one of God's archangels in the Kabbalah literature. There, Gabriel is portrayed as working in concert with Michael as part of God's court. Gabriel is not to be prayed to because only God can answer prayers and sends Gabriel as his agent.

According to Jewish mythology, in the Garden of Eden there is a tree of life or the "tree of souls" that blossoms and produces new souls, which fall into the Guf, the Treasury of Souls. Gabriel reaches into the treasury and takes out the first soul that comes into his hand. Then Lailah, the Angel of Conception, watches over the embryo until it is born.

Christianity

New Testament

Gabriel's first appearance in the New Testament, concerns the annunciation of the birth of John the Baptist. John's father Zacharias, a priest of the course of Abia, was childless because his wife Elisabeth was barren. An angel appears to Zacharias while he is ministering in the Temple, to announce the birth of his son. When Zacharias questions the angel, the angel gives his name as Gabriel:

After completing his required week of ministry, Zacharias returns to his home and his wife Elizabeth conceives. After she has completed five months of her pregnancy, Gabriel appears again, now to Mary, to announce the birth of Jesus:

Gabriel only appears by name in those two passages in Luke. In the first passage the angel identified himself as Gabriel, but in the second it is Luke who identified him as Gabriel. The only other named angels in the New Testament are Michael the Archangel (in ) and Abaddon (in ).

Intertestamental literature
Gabriel is not called an archangel in the canonical Bible. However, the intertestamental period (roughly 200 BC – 50 AD) produced a wealth of literature, much of it having an apocalyptic orientation. The names and ranks of angels and devils were greatly expanded in this literature, and each had particular duties and status before God. This was the period when Gabriel was first referred to as an archangel.

In 1 Enoch 9:1–3, Gabriel, along with Michael, Uriel and Suriel, "saw much blood being shed upon the earth" (9:1) and heard the souls of men cry, "Bring our cause before the Most High" (9:3). In 1 Enoch 10:1, the reply came from "the Most High, the Holy and Great One" who sent forth agents, including Gabriel—

Gabriel is the fifth of the five angels who keep watch: "Gabriel, one of the holy angels, who is over Paradise and the serpents and the Cherubim" (1 Enoch 20:7).

When Enoch asked who the four figures were that he had seen:

Gnosticism
The heretical Christian movement of Gnosticism paid special attention to angels as beings belonging to a pantheon of spiritual forces involved in the creation of the world. According to one ancient Gnostic manuscript, the Holy Book of the Great Invisible Spirit, Gabriel is a divine being and inhabitant of the Pleroma who existed prior to the Demiurge.

Medieval Christian traditions

In a famous early work, the "four homilies on the Missus Est", Saint Bernard of Clairvaux (1090-1153 AD) interpreted Gabriel's name as "the strength of God", and his symbolic function in the gospel story as announcement of the strength or virtue of Christ, both as the strength of God incarnate and as the strength given by God to the timorous people who would bring into the world a fearful and troublesome event. "Therefore it was an opportune choice that designated Gabriel for the work he had to accomplish, or rather, because he was to accomplish it therefore he was called Gabriel."

Feast day
The feast day of Saint Gabriel the Archangel was exclusively celebrated on 18 March according to many sources dating between 1588 and 1921; unusually, a source published in 1856 has the feast celebrated on 7 April for unknown reasons (a parenthetical note states that the day is normally celebrated on 18 March). Writer Elizabeth Drayson mentions the feast being celebrated on 18 March 1588 in her 2013 book "The Lead Books of Granada".

One of the oldest out-of-print sources placing the feast on 18 March, first published in 1608, is "Flos sanctorum: historia general de la vida y hechos de Jesu-Christo...y de los santos de que reza y haze fiesta la Iglesia Catholica..." by the Spanish writer Alonso de Villegas; a newer edition of this book was published in 1794. Another source published in Ireland in 1886 the Irish Ecclesiastical Record also mentions 18 March.

The feast of Saint Gabriel was included by Pope Benedict XV in the General Roman Calendar in 1921, for celebration on 24 March. In 1969 the day was officially transferred to 29 September for celebration in conjunction with the feast of the archangels St. Michael and St. Raphael. The Church of England has also adopted the 29 September date, known as Michaelmas.

The Eastern Orthodox Church and those Eastern Catholic Churches which follow the Byzantine Rite celebrate his feast day (Synaxis of the Archangel Michael and the Other Bodiless Powers) on 8 November (for those churches that follow the traditional Julian Calendar, 8 November currently falls on 21 November of the modern Gregorian Calendar, a difference of 13 days). Eastern Orthodox commemorate him, not only on his November feast, but also on two other days:

 26 March is the "Synaxis of the Archangel Gabriel" and celebrates his role in the Annunciation (eavetaking of the Annunciation),

 13 July is also known as the "Synaxis of the Archangel Gabriel", and celebrates all the appearances and miracles attributed to Gabriel throughout history. The feast was first established on Mount Athos when, in the 9th century, during the reign of Emperor Basil II and the Empress Constantina Porphyrogenitus and while Nicholas Chrysoverges was Patriarch of Constantinople, the Archangel appeared in a cell near Karyes, where he wrote with his finger on a stone tablet the hymn to the Theotokos, "It is truly meet...".

Saint Gabriel the Archangel is commemorated on the vigil of Annunciation (24 March) by Antiochian Western Rite Vicariate and ROCOR Western Rite.

The Coptic Orthodox Church celebrates his feast on 13 Paoni, 22 Koiak and 26 Paoni.

The Ethiopian Church celebrates his feast on 18 (in the Ethiopian calendar) December, with a sizeable number of its believers making a pilgrimage to a church dedicated to "Saint Gabriel" in Kulubi and Wonkshet on that day.

Additionally, Gabriel is the patron saint of messengers, those who work for broadcasting and telecommunications such as radio and television, postal workers, clerics, diplomats, and stamp collectors.

Gabriel's horn

A familiar image of Gabriel has him blowing a trumpet blast to announce the resurrection of the dead at the end of time. However, though the Bible mentions a trumpet blast preceding the resurrection of the dead, it never specifies Gabriel as the trumpeter. Different passages state different things: the angels of the Son of Man (Matthew 24:31); the voice of the Son of God (John 5:25-29); God's trumpet (I Thessalonians 4:16); seven angels sounding a series of blasts (Revelation 8-11); or simply "a trumpet will sound" (I Corinthians 15:52). Likewise the early Christian Church Fathers do not mention Gabriel as a trumpeter; and in Jewish and Muslim traditions, Gabriel is again not identified as a trumpeter.

The earliest known identification of Gabriel as a trumpeter comes from the Hymn of the Armenian Saint Nerses Shnorhali, "for Protection in the Night":

The sound of Gabriel's trumpet on the last night, make us worthy to hear, and to stand on your right hand among the sheep with lanterns of inextinguishable light; to be like the five wise virgins, so that with the bridegroom in the bride chamber we, his spiritual brides may enter into glory.

In 1455, in Armenian art, there is an illustration in an Armenian manuscript showing Gabriel sounding his trumpet as the dead climb out of their graves.

Evangelical Christian traditions
The image of Gabriel's trumpet blast to announce the end of time became was taken up in Evangelical Christianity, where it became widespread, notably in Negro spirituals.
An early example occurs in John Milton's Paradise Lost (1667):
Betwixt these rockie pillars Gabriel sat
Chief of the Angelic guards (IV.545f)...
He ended, and the Son gave signal high
To the bright minister that watch'd, he blew
His trumpet, heard in Oreb since perhaps
When God descended, and perhaps once more
To sound at general doom. (XI.72ff).

It is unclear how the Armenian conception inspired Milton and the spirituals, though they presumably have a common source.

Latter-day Saints
In the Church of Jesus Christ of Latter-day Saints theology, Gabriel is believed to have lived a mortal life as the prophet Noah. The two are regarded as the same individual; Noah being his mortal name and Gabriel being his heavenly name.

Islam 

Gabriel (also  or Jabrāʾīl; derived from the ) is venerated as one of the primary archangels and as the Angel of Revelation in Islam.

Exegetical Quranic literature narrates that Muhammad saw the archangel Gabriel in his full angelic splendor only twice, the first time being when he received his first revelation. As the Bible portrays Gabriel as a celestial messenger sent to Daniel, Mary, and Zechariah, Islamic tradition holds that Gabriel was sent to numerous pre-Islamic Biblical prophets with revelation and divine injunctions, including Adam, whom Muslims believe was consoled by Gabriel some time after the Fall, too. He is known by many names in Islam, such as "keeper of holiness". In Hadith traditions, Jibril is said to have six hundred wings.

Tasks 
Muslims believe that Gabriel was mainly tasked with transmitting the scriptures from God to the prophets and messengers, as Asbab al-Nuzul or revelation of Al-Baqara, Ayah 124| when Muhammad was questioned which angel is revealing the holy scriptures revelation, and Muhammad told the Jews it is revealed by Gabriel who is tasked to it.

Muslims also revere Gabriel for a number of events predating what they regard as the first revelation, narrated in the Quran. Muslims believe that Gabriel was the angel who informed Zachariah (Zakariyyā) of     Yaḥyā's (John's) birth, as well as Mary (Maryam) of the future nativity of Jesus; and that Gabriel was one of three angels who had earlier informed Abraham (ʾIbrāhīm) of the birth of Isaac (ʾIsḥāq) []. Gabriel also makes a famous appearance in the Hadith of Gabriel, in which he questions Muhammad on the core tenets of Islam.

Gabriel is also believed to have delivered punishment from God to the Sodomite by leveling the entire Sodom city with a tip of his wing. According to a Hadith narrated by Abu Dharr al-Ghifari, which is compiled by al-Hakim al-Tirmidhi, Gabriel has an ability to regulate Feeling or Perception of human, particularly a feel of happiness or sadness. 

Gabriel is believed to have helped Muhammad overcome his adversaries significantly against a demon (ʻifrīt) during the Mi'raj. Gabriel is believed to have helped Muhammad overcome his adversaries during the Battle of Badr, where according to scholars and clerics of Islam, the various hadiths, both authentics and inauthentics, has mentioned that Gabriel, Michael, Raphael, and thousands of best angels from third level of heaven, all came to the battle of Badr by impersonating appearance of Zubayr ibn al-Awwam, a Companions of the Prophet and bodyguard of the prophet. This is deemed as Zubayr personal honor according to Islamic belief. Meanwhile, Safiur Rahman Mubarakpuri has recorded in his historiography works of Quran and Hadith revelation in Prophetic biography, that Sa'd ibn Abi Waqqas testified he saw two unidentified warriors clad in white has protected Muhammad during the Battle of Uhud, That later being confirmed by Muhammad those two unidentified warriors were Jibril and Mikail in disguise.

Moreover, he is believed to have further encouraged Muhammad to wage war and attack the Jewish tribe of Banu Qurayza. Another appearance of Gabriel in Islamic religious texts were found in numerous Hadiths during the Battle of Hunayn, where the Gabriel stood next to Muhammad. 

Other Islamic texts and some Apocryphal literature also supported Gabriel's role as a celestial warrior. Though alternate theories exist, whether the occurrence of the Holy Spirit in the Quran refers to Gabriel or not, remains an issue of scholarly debate. However, a clear distinction between apocryphal and Quranic references to Gabriel is that the former doesn't designate him as the Holy Spirit in the First Book of Enoch, which narrates the story of Gabriel defeating the Nephilim.

Yezidi tradition
Yazidis consider Gabriel one of the Seven Mysteries, the heptad to which God entrusted the world, and sometimes identified with the archangel Melek Taus.

Art, entertainment, and media
Angels are described as pure spirits. The lack of a defined form allows artists wide latitude in depicting them. Amelia R. Brown draws comparisons in Byzantine iconography between portrayals of angels and the conventions used to depict court eunuchs. Mainly from the Caucasus, they tended to have light eyes, hair, and skin; and those "castrated in childhood developed a distinctive skeletal structure, lacked full masculine musculature, body hair and beards...." As officials, they would wear a white tunic decorated with gold. Brown suggests that  "Byzantine artists drew, consciously or not, on this iconography of the court eunuch." Some recent popular works on angels consider Gabriel to be female or androgynous.

Gabriel sculptures

Festivals
Baltimore's "Little Italy" has for over 80 years hosted an annual "end of summer" St. Gabriel Festival that features a procession with a statue of the saint carried through the streets.

Film
In Liliom (1930), Gabriel is portrayed by Harvey Clark.
In The Green Pastures (1936), Gabriel is portrayed by Oscar Polk.
In Heaven Only Knows (1947), Gabriel was portrayed by William Farnum.
In The Littlest Angel (1969; television film), Gabriel is portrayed by Cab Calloway.
In horror film The Prophecy (1995), Gabriel (portrayed by Christopher Walken) searches for an evil soul on Earth during an end-of-days angelic civil war. He is also a character in The Prophecy II (1998) and The Prophecy 3: The Ascent (2000).
In Mary, Mother of Jesus (1999; television film), Gabriel is portrayed by John Light.
In the fantasy/horror film Constantine (2005), Tilda Swinton portrays an androgynous archangel Gabriel.
In the action/horror film Gabriel (2007), the eponymous character (portrayed by Andy Whitfield) fights to save the souls in purgatory by defeating the evil fallen angels.
In the apocalyptic supernatural action film Legion (2010), Kevin Durand plays the role of Archangel Gabriel, the leader of the angel army, and the main antagonist. The story was continued in the TV series Dominion.
In the analog horror series The Mandela Catalogue, A video titled Overthrone portrays Gabriel as an archangel tricking the shepherds into thinking that he was the true savior, not Jesus. This leads to the events of the series having hostile organisms called Alternates.

Games
2005: Spanish role-playing game Anima: Beyond Fantasy - Gabriel is as the humans know one of the seven "Beryls" (godlike beings of light) and is identified with the archangel of the same name. She has associated love, friendship, arts, and peace.
In the Japanese role-playing game Shin Megami Tensei - Gabriel is one of the Demons the player can summon to assist in battle.
In the video game El Shaddai: Ascension of the Metatron, based on the Book of Enoch, Gabriel is featured alongside Michael, Raphael, and Uriel as a guide for Enoch on his quest. All four archangels take the form of swans while on Earth. Gabriel is depicted as female in this interpretation and implied to be an angel of wisdom. She is associated with the Veil weapon Enoch uses.
In Ultrakill, a retro first-person shooter, Gabriel is featured as one of the bosses and a primary story character.
In The Binding of Isaac (video game), a roguelike dungeon crawler, the player is able to fight Gabriel and Uriel to obtain their key pieces in order to fight Mega Satan.

Literature
 In his epic poem Paradise Lost, John Milton made Gabriel chief of the angelic guards placed over Paradise
 The Hebrew poem "Elifelet" (אליפלט) by Nathan Alterman, put to music and often heard on the Israeli Radio, tells of a heroic, self-sacrificing Israeli soldier being killed in battle. Upon the protagonist's death, the angel Gabriel descends to Earth, in order to comfort the spirit of the fallen hero and take him up to Heaven
 The main character of Salman Rushdie's The Satanic Verses (1988) believes that he is the modern incarnation of Gabriel.
In the Japanese light novel series No Game No Life (2012), Jibril is a member of the Flügel race and was a member of the Council of 18 Wings, a prominent section in the government. She is depicted as loving knowledge and books.
 In volume 3 of the Japanese light novel series The Devil Is a Part-Timer!, an archangel named Gabriel appeared and is the guardian of the Sephirah Yesod.
 In the Japanese light novel High School DxD features Gabriel as one of the Four Great Seraph whom are the highest ranking Seraph alongside Michael, Uriel and Raphael. In the novel, Gabriel is depicted as a female angel with immense angelic beauty and is given the titles of "The Strongest Woman in Heaven" and "The Most Beautiful Woman in Heaven".
 In August Wilson's Fences (1985), the mentally handicapped character Gabriel believes with every fibre of his soul that he is the Archangel Gabriel. He carries around a trumpet on him always, and strives to chase away the "hellhounds". In the last scene of the play, he calls for Saint Peter to open up the gates.

Music
 The eccentric English hagiographer and antiquarian, Sabine Baring-Gould (1834–1924) wrote "Gabriel's Message", the English translation of the Basque Christmas carol Birjina gaztetto bat zegoen. The original charol is likely related to the 13th or 14th-century Latin chant Angelus Ad Virginem, which itself is based on the biblical account of the Annunciation in the Gospel of Luke.
 In "My Own Prison" by Creed, Gabriel is mentioned as deciphering the visions to the main character in the song.
 "Sugar Baby", the last track on Bob Dylan's Love and Theft album, contains this reference: 

 "Blow Your Trumpets Gabriel" by Polish black metal band Behemoth.
 The 1996 garage/house song "Gabriel" by Roy Davies Jnr (featuring vocals from Peven Everett) is about the archangel Gabriel. In the chorus, Everett can be heard singing "Gabriel play" in reference to Gabriel's trumpet. A trumpet is also heard in the song right after this line is sung.

Visual art
See also Gabriel gallery in Commons.

Daniel 8:15 describes Gabriel as appearing in the "likeness of man" and in Daniel 9:21 he is referred to as "the man Gabriel". David Everson observes that "such anthropomorphic descriptions of an angel are consistent with previous...descriptions of angels," as in Genesis 19:5.

Gabriel is most often portrayed in the context of scenes of the Annunciation. In 2008 a 16th-century drawing by Lucas van Leyden of the Netherlands was discovered. George R. Goldner, chairman of the department of prints and drawings at New York's Metropolitan Museum of Art, suggested that the sketch was for a stained glass window. "The fact that the archangel is an ordinary-looking person and not an idealized boy is typical of the artist", said Goldner.

In chronological order (to see each item, follow the link in the footnote):
 Archangel Gabriel (Triptych), early 10th century, Benaki Museum
 The Archangel Gabriel, Pisan, c. 1325–50, National Gallery of Art
 The Archangel Gabriel, Masolino da Panicale, c. 1420–30, National Gallery of Art
 Justice between the Archangels Michael and Gabriel, Jacobello del Fiore, 1421
 Merode Altarpiece (Triptych), Robert Campin, c. 1425, Metropolitan Museum of Art
 The Angel Gabriel, Agostino di Duccio, c. 1450
 Annunciation, Leonardo da Vinci, c. 1475
 The Angel Gabriel, Neroccio d'Landi, c. 1490
 The Angel Gabriel, late 15th or early 16th century, Flemish, National Gallery of Art
 The Angel Gabriel, Ferrari Gaudenzio, 1511, National Gallery, London
 Gabriel delivering the Annunciation El Greco, 1575 (pictured above)
 Go Down Death, Aaron Douglas, 1934

The Military Order of Saint Gabriel was established to recognize "individuals who have made significant contributions to the U.S. Army Public Affairs community and practice." The medallion depicts St. Gabriel sounding a trumpet, while the obverse displays the Army Public Affairs emblem.

Television
The Twilight Zone (1960) episode "A Passage for Trumpet" – The down-and-out musician Joey Crown (Jack Klugman) meets an enigmatic trumpet player named "Gabe" (played by John Anderson), in what has been described as Rod Serling's version of It's a Wonderful Life.
Supernatural (2005) – Gabriel, portrayed by Richard Speight Jr., is a runaway archangel who kills people he deems evil, also interacting with other angels, including his siblings Michael, Raphael, and Lucifer.
Dominion (2014) – Gabriel, portrayed by Carl Beukes, is the series antagonist, who plans to kill the Archangel Michael and annihilate humanity.
Now Apocalypse (2019) – Gabriel, portrayed by Tyler Posey, is an enigmatic trumpet player who has a passionate tryst with series protagonist Ulysses Zane before warning him about an impending apocalypse.
Amazon Prime miniseries Good Omens (2019) – Gabriel is portrayed by Jon Hamm. The show is based on the novel by Terry Pratchett and Neil Gaiman.

See also

References

Notes

Citations

Further reading

 
 
 
Bamberger, Bernard J. (2006). Fallen Angels: Soldiers of Satan's Realm. Philadelphia, PA: Jewish Publication Society. . 
Briggs, Constance Victoria (1997). The Encyclopedia of Angels: An A-to-Z Guide with Nearly 4,000 Entries. New York, NY: Plume. . 
Bunson, Matthew (1996). Angels A to Z: A Who's Who of the Heavenly Host. New York, NY: Crown Trade Paperbacks. . 
Cruz, Joan C. (1999). Angels and Devils. Rockford, IL: Tan Books & Publishers. . 
Davidson, Gustav (1994). A Dictionary of Angels: Including the Fallen Angels. New York, NY: Simon & Schuster. . 
Dennis, Geoffrey (2007). The Encyclopedia of Jewish Myth, Magic, and Mysticism. Woodbury, MN: Llewellyn Publications. . 
Graham, Billy (1994). Angels: God's Secret Agents. Woodbury, MN: Llewellyn Publications. .
Guiley, Rosemary (1996). "G". Encyclopedia of Angels (1st ed.). New York, NY: Facts on File, Inc. pp. 69–70. . . 
Guiley, Rosemary (2004). Encyclopedia of Angels (2nd ed.). New York, NY: Facts on File, Inc. . . 
Kreeft, Peter J. (1995). Angels and Demons: What Do We Really Know About Them?. San Francisco, CA: Ignatius Press. . 
Lewis, James R.; Oliver, Evelyn Dorothy (2008-05-01). Angels A to Z (2nd ed.). Detroit, MI: Visible Ink Press. pp. 156–157. .
Melville, Francis (2001). The Book of Angels: Turn to Your Angels for Guidance, Comfort, and Inspiration (1st ed.). Hauppauge, NY: Barron's Educational Series. . 
Ronner, John (1993). Know Your Angels: The Angel Almanac With Biographies of 100 Prominent Angels in Legend & Folklore-And Much More!. Murfreesboro, TN: Mamre Press. .

External links

 Archangel Correspondence. Archangel Gabriel, Angelic & Planetary Symbols. Last accessed 24 March 2017.
 Catholic Encyclopedia. St. Gabriel the Archangel. Last accessed 24 March 2017.
 Celdrán, José Alfredo González, and Ruck, Carl A. P. Daturas for the Virgin  Last accessed 24 March 2017.
 Christian Art. Icons of the Archangel Gabriel. Last accessed 24 March 2017.
 Jewish Encyclopedia.com. Gabriel. Last accessed 24 March 2017.
 Hassett, Maurice. "Early Christian Representations of Angels." The Catholic Encyclopedia. Vol. 1. New York: Robert Appleton Company, 1907. Last accessed 24 March 2017.

 
Angels in the Book of Enoch
Archangels
Archangels in Christianity
Archangel in Judaism
Archangels in Islam
Book of Daniel
Book of Ezekiel
Christian saints from the New Testament
Christian saints from the Old Testament
Individual angels
People in the canonical gospels
Quranic figures
Yazidi mythology
Mythological musical instruments
Eastern Orthodox saints
Western Rite Orthodoxy